Lenka Cenková (born 24 January 1977) is a former professional Czech tennis player.

Career

Singles
In 1996, she achieved her best WTA Tour result by reaching the semifinals at the ECM Prague Open held at Karlovy Vary. She lost the semifinal match to Patty Schnyder 7–5, 6–7, 6–7. She also reached the quarterfinals at the 1996 Austrian Open held at Maria Lankowitz, beating the No. 2 seed, Judith Wiesner in the first round, and eventually losing to Sandra Cecchini, 3–6, 7–5, 2–6.

In 1997, Cenková played in her first Grand Slam singles draws at the Australian Open and French Open, losing in the first round of both to Meilen Tu and Brenda Schultz-McCarthy, respectively. She did, however, reach the quarterfinals at the Hobart International in Australia, after wins over Barbara Rittner and Florencia Labat, succumbing to Dominique Van Roost in the quarterfinals in straight sets. Van Roost eventually went on to win the tournament.

She also played at the Birmingham Classic in 1997, losing in the second round to Magdalena Maleeva.

Doubles
She managed to reach a WTA Tour doubles final at the 1996 Austrian Open with Kateřina Kroupová-Šišková.
She also reached the second round at the 1996 US Open.

WTA career finals

Doubles: 1 (runner-up)

ITF finals

Singles: 9 (4–5)

Doubles: 19 (9–10)

External links
 
 
 Australian open profile
 tennisexplorer.com player profile

1977 births
Living people
Czech female tennis players
Sportspeople from Třinec